KWXX-FM (94.7 FM) is a radio station in Hilo, Hawaii broadcasting an adult contemporary format as well as local music.  A satellite station, KAOY (101.5 FM), is licensed to Kealakekua, Hawaii and serves the Kailua-Kona area.  The station is owned by New West Broadcasting Corp.

History
KAOY went on the air as KKON-FM on May 18, 1981.  In 1982, the station changed its call sign to KOAS. On February 7, 1992, the current call letters were adapted.

KWXX went on the air on May 2, 1983.

References

External links

WXX-FM
Radio stations established in 1983
Mainstream adult contemporary radio stations in the United States
1983 establishments in Hawaii